The Highmark Events Center, formerly The Hammermill, is a 2,800 seat basketball arena home to the Gannon Golden Knights located on the campus of Gannon University in Erie, Pennsylvania. The Highmark Events Center is also home to Gannon's acrobatics and tumbling, women's volleyball, and wrestling teams.

History
The Facility was originally known as the Gannon Auditorium, or "The Audi". The facility was rededicated and renamed the Hammermill Center in February 1983 in honor of the Hammermill Paper Company whose donation enabled the University to make repairs and improvements.

The home of the Gannon Golden Knights has since received a new name – Highmark Events Center – thanks to a major donation from Highmark Health that will also support renovations to the facility - in February 2022.

The 36,560-square-foot center – formerly known as the Hammermill Center – is home to the university’s basketball, volleyball, wrestling, acrobatics and tumbling, and competitive cheer teams. The facility is also where our teams are known to win some 77% of their all-time contests in this center. Beyond that, they achieve outstanding academic success with our more than 700 student-athletes most recently achieving an overall average 3.4 GPA.

Renovations to the Highmark Center will create the next noticeable change to Erie’s downtown landscape and Perry Square. The facility has been the front porch of the university’s Erie campus for 70 years, drawing crowds of up to 2,800 people not only for athletic events but for many other community lectures, concerts, camps, events and programs – all bringing people downtown and supporting our regional economy. Renovations are expected to exceed $10 million with major changes planned for its interior and exterior.

By modernizing this facility, we will provide the best experiences for our student-athletes while paying homage to its traditions and long-standing history on campus.

Gannon’s athletic complex has been the home for Golden Knight teams since the basketball programs began play there during the 1949-50 season. The facility was originally known as the Gannon Auditorium, and affectionately referred to as “The Audi” by longtime Gannon faithful. The facility was rededicated and renamed the Hammermill Center – “The Mill” – in February 1983 in honor of the wonderful generosity of the then Hammermill Paper Co. The university celebrated the official renaming of the Highmark Events Center in February 2022.

Attendance records
Attendance records for the past 10 seasons.

^ Member of the Great Lakes Intercollegiate Athletic Conference (GLIAC)

^^ Member of the Pennsylvania State Athletic Conference (PSAC)

References

Sports venues in Pennsylvania
Gannon University